Giraut de Bornelh (c. 1138 – 1215), whose first name is also spelled Guiraut and whose toponym is de Borneil or de Borneyll, was a troubadour connected to the castle of the viscount of Limoges. He is credited with the formalisation, if not the invention, of the "light" style, or trobar leu.

Biography
Giraut was born to a lower-class family in the Limousin, probably in Bourney, near Excideuil in modern-day France. Guiraut might have accompanied Richard I of England and Aimar V of Limoges on the Third Crusade and stayed a while with the "good prince of Antioch", Bohemond III. He certainly made a pilgrimage to the Holy Land, but perhaps before the Crusade.

Works
About ninety of Giraut's poems and four of his melodies survive; these were held in high esteem in the 13th century: Petrarch called him "master of the troubadours", while Dante, who preferred Arnaut Daniel, mentions that many considered him superior.
Notable pieces include:
 S'anc jorn aqui joi e solaz, a planh about the death of Raimbaut d'Aurenga.
 Ara·m platz, Giraut de Borneill, a tenso with Raimbaut d'Aurenga discussing trobar clus versus trobar leu.
 Be me plairia, senh'en reis, a tenso with king Alfons II of Aragon Giraut contributes to the poetical debate as to whether a lady is dishonoured by taking a lover who is richer than herself. This debate was begun by Guilhem de Saint-Leidier, taken up by Azalais de Porcairagues and Raimbaut d'Aurenga, and continued in a partimen between Dalfi d'Alvernha and Perdigon.
 Reis glorios (glorious king), a well-known alba.

Bibliography

Sharman, Ruth V. (1989). The Cansos and Sirventes of the Troubadour Giraut de Borneil. Cambridge: Cambridge University Press. .

External links
 Guiraut de Bornelh, (with trans. James H. Donalson), Songs, vol. 1 and Songs, vol. 2
 Complete works, including all extant melodies at trobar.org

1130s births
1215 deaths
Christians of the Third Crusade
12th-century French troubadours
Medieval writers about the Crusades
13th-century French troubadours
People from Dordogne